Gustavo Henrique Correia Pereira (born 11 January 1997), commonly known as Gustavo, is a Brazilian footballer who currently plays as a defender for Vera Cruz-PE, on loan from Retrô.

Career statistics

Club

Notes

References

1997 births
Living people
Brazilian footballers
Association football defenders
Belo Jardim Futebol Clube players
Vera Cruz Futebol Clube players
Retrô Futebol Clube Brasil players